Blizanci (Cyrillic: Близанци) is a village in the municipality of Čitluk, Bosnia and Herzegovina.

The village is known for its stony vineyards, consisting primarily of Žilavka grapes.

Demographics 
According to the 2013 census, its population was 525.

References

Populated places in Čitluk, Bosnia and Herzegovina